Marietta Žigalová (born 23 November 1968, in Ružomberok) is a former professional Slovak female fitness competitor. She was the Absolute World and Europe Fitness Champion and the Fitness Olympia competitor.

References

Slovak sportspeople
Košice
Fitness and figure competitors
Sportspeople from Ružomberok
Living people
1968 births